Nebria holzunensis is a species of ground beetle from Nebriinae subfamily that is endemic to Altai region of Russia.

References

holzunensis
Beetles described in 2006
Endemic fauna of Altai